The 1975 Men's South American Volleyball Championship, the 11th tournament, took place in 1975 in Asunción.

Final positions

Mens South American Volleyball Championship, 1975
Men's South American Volleyball Championships
1975 in South American sport
International volleyball competitions hosted by Paraguay 
1975 in Paraguayan sport